Standby is a 2012 South Korean sitcom that aired on MBC from April 9 to October 5, 2012 on Mondays to Fridays at 19:45. It is about the everyday stories of producers, writers and announcers working at TV11, a fictional broadcasting company.

Cast

Main characters
 Ryu Jin as Ryu Jin-haeng - timid announcer
 Lee Ki-woo as Ryu Ki-woo 
 Ha Seok-jin as Ha Seok-jin
 Claudia Kim as Kim Soo-hyun - an easygoing variety producer
 Jung So-min as Jung So-min 
 Im Si-wan as Yim Si-wan 
 Choi Jung-woo as Ryu Jung-woo
 Park Joon-geum as Park Joon-geum
 Kim Yeon-woo as Kim Yeon-woo
 Go Kyung-pyo as Kim Kyung-pyo 
 Simon Dominic as Ssam D 
 Kim Ye-won as Kim Ye-won

Supporting characters
Park Eun-ji as Park Eun-ji
Kim Seung-pil as cameraman
Woo Hye-jin as Choi Yoon-hee
Sa Mi-ja as Jung-woo's mother
Jung Ga-ram as Jung Ga-ram
Yeom Dong-heon as Jung-woo's friend
Ahn Hye-kyung as lawyer 
Choi Eun-kyung as president of education consulting company

Cameo appearances
Park Myung-soo as Ascetic Geosung 
Julien Kang as Joon-geum's fan 
Lee Chae-young as Seok-jin's first love 
Park Se-mi as high school student on blind date 
Hyemi as high school student on blind date 
Park Mi-sun as Park Mi-sun 
Kim Young-ok as Joon-geum's mother 
Yoo So-young as So-ra 
Hwang Kwang-hee as Ha Kwang-hee, Seok-jin's younger brother (ep 76-77)
Ha Dong-hoon as Rapper H

References

External links
 Standby official MBC website 
 

MBC TV television dramas
2012 South Korean television series debuts
2012 South Korean television series endings
Korean-language television shows
South Korean romance television series
South Korean comedy television series
Television series by Chorokbaem Media